Percy Amherst (30 November 1839 – 30 January 1910) was an English first-class cricketer who played all his only game for Marylebone Cricket Club.
His highest score of 2 came when playing for the Marylebone Cricket Club in the match against Cambridge University Cricket Club.

References

English cricketers
Marylebone Cricket Club cricketers
1839 births
1910 deaths